The men's discus throw at the 2007 All-Africa Games was held on July 18.

Results

References
Results

Discus